Innocence is an EP by the Norwich, UK band Sennen, released in the US on September 13, 2010.

Track listing
"Innocence"
"SOS"
"Don't Put Your Love to Waste"
"December"
"Sennen's Week Away"

References

External links 
 Sennen's Innocence EP on Rhapsody
 Sennen's Innocence EP Review at Room Thirteen
 Sennen's Official MySpace Page
 Sennen's Official Web Site

2010 EPs